Bernhard Pick (Kempen 19 December 1842 – 1917) was a German-American Lutheran pastor and scholar.

He studied at Union Theological Seminary in New York City and after became a pastor. As a scholar he contributed many articles to the Schaff-Herzog Encyclopaedia of Religious Knowledge and McClintock and James Strong's Cyclopaedia of Biblical, Theological, and Ecclesiastical Literature. He also provided the index to Johann Peter Lange's Commentary on the Old Testament 1882 and an "Index to the Ante-Nicene Fathers" (1887). Pick's interest in hymnology led to Luther as a Hymnist Philadelphia, 1875 and an edition of Luther's "Ein feste Burg" in 19 Languages 1880; enlarged in 21 languages, Chicago, 1883.

Works
Many of Pick's works are now being reissued with 21st-century publication dates:
 Judisches Volksleben zur Zeit Jesus Rochester, New York, 1880
 A Historical Sketch of the Jews since the Destruction of Jerusalem 1887
 The Life of Christ according to Extra-Canonical Sources 1887
 The Talmud: what it is and what it says about Jesus and the Christians 1887
 Paralipomena - Remains of Gospels and Sayings of Christ 1908 - including a chapter The Gospel to the Hebrews
 The Cabala: Its Influence on Judaism and Christianity 1913
 The Apocryphal Acts of Paul, Peter, John, Andrew and Thomas. The Open Court Publishing Co., Kegan Paul, Trench, Trübner & Co., Ltd, Chicago, London 1909.
He also translated Franz Delitzsch Jewish Artisan Life in the Time of Jesus 1883

References

External links
 
 

1842 births
1917 deaths
American Lutherans
Historians of Christianity
Historians of Jews and Judaism
Christian Hebraists
American historians of religion
19th-century Lutherans